Brendan Rendall Bracken, 1st Viscount Bracken, PC (15 February 1901 – 8 August 1958) was an Irish-born businessman, politician and a minister in the British Conservative cabinet. He is best remembered for supporting Winston Churchill during the Second World War. He was also the founder of the modern version of the Financial Times. He was Minister of Information from 1941 to 1945.

Early life
Brendan Rendall Bracken was born in Templemore, County Tipperary, Ireland, the second son and third of the four children of Joseph Kevin Bracken (1852–1904), builder and monumental mason, and his second wife, Hannah Agnes Ryan (1872–1928). His father had belonged to the IRB and was one of the seven founders of the GAA.

Widowed in 1904, Hannah Bracken had moved her family (including two stepdaughters) by 1908 to Dublin, where Brendan attended St Patrick's National School, Drumcondra, until 1910, when he was transferred to the O'Connell School, run by the Irish Christian Brothers. Distressed by his misbehaviour, his mother sent him in 1915 to Mungret College, a Jesuit boarding school in County Limerick, but he quickly bolted and ran up hotel bills. She then sent him to Australia to live with a cousin who was a priest in Echuca, Victoria. The young man led a nomadic existence in Australia, moving often but reading avidly, and becoming self-educated.

In 1919, Bracken returned briefly to Ireland, finding his mother settled in County Meath. He distanced himself from Ireland as well as his siblings, who were in revolt over their father's inheritance. He moved instead to settle in Liverpool. In 1920, he appeared at Sedbergh School, claiming to be a 15-year-old and an Australian, to have been orphaned in a bush fire and to have a family connection to Montagu Rendell, the headmaster of Winchester College. Without fully believing the story, Sedbergh's headmaster, impressed by the young Bracken's depth of knowledge and eagerness to progress, accepted him. By the end of one term, his Irish republican heritage and his five formative years in Australia had blended with the elements and trappings of a British public school man.

He might have had good reason to hide his Irish heritage, as the Irish War of Independence (1919–1921) had aroused hostility toward Irish people living in Great Britain. For whatever reason, that denial became a regular feature of his life. Another example occurred in 1926, when he met Major-General Emmet Dalton, a former senior commander in the new Irish Army, in London. The former British Army officer, turned IRA confidant, who was one of General Michael Collins's right-hand men, recalled meeting Bracken at national school in Dublin. Bracken denied that, but Dalton insisted that he remembered the smell of Bracken's corduroy trousers. A third example occurred during the Second World War, when Bracken told people that his brother had been killed in action at Narvik, but his brother was alive and well in Ireland and was importuning Brendan for money.

Business and political career
After Sedbergh, whose "old boy" tie he used to good effect, Bracken was briefly a schoolmaster at Bishop's Stortford College. He then made a successful career from 1922 as a magazine publisher and newspaper editor in London. His initial success was based on selling advertising space to at least cover the cost of each number. In the 1923 election, he assisted Winston Churchill's unsuccessful attempt to be elected as Member of Parliament (MP) for Leicester West, which began their political association. He also assisted in Churchill's 1924 Westminster Abbey by-election campaign.  In the fighting that occurred on the streets, Bracken was stabbed.

Bracken himself was elected to the House of Commons in 1929 as a Unionist for the London constituency of North Paddington. Stanley Baldwin described Bracken as Churchill's "faithful chela", chela being the Hindi word for disciple.

Many of his early magazine stories included a political flavour, and he commissioned articles from a wide range of politicians such as Churchill and Benito Mussolini. Business and politics permanently overlapped in his life, like that of the career of his occasional friend Lord Beaverbrook. He needed politicians for stories and they needed the publicity his publications gave. A supporter of Churchill from 1923, who was out of Parliament and in his political wilderness, Bracken was invited to join Churchill's "Other Club". Their lives changed from the outbreak of the Second World War in 1939.

In 1926, he was the founding editor of The Banker, and magazine and bankers still name their respected annual Bank of the Year awards "Brackens" in his honour. The Banker features a regular column called "Bracken", focusing on providing views and perspectives on how to improve the global financial system.

Assists in selection of Churchill
In two matters relating to Churchill, Bracken can be said to have played a key part behind the scenes. When Neville Chamberlain prepared to resign in May 1940, the candidates to succeed him were Churchill or Lord Halifax. The political issue at stake at the time was which potential successor would the Labour Party accept in the formation of a National Government. Churchill's view was that the Labour Party would not support him and so agreed with Chamberlain to nominate Halifax.

When Bracken became aware of Churchill's agreement to nominate Halifax, he convinced Churchill that the Labour Party would indeed support him as Chamberlain's successor and Lord Halifax's appointment would hand certain victory to Hitler. Bracken advised Churchill tactically to say nothing when the three met to arrange the succession. After a deafening silence when Churchill was expected to nominate Halifax, the latter obligingly ruled himself out, and Churchill was put forward as Britain's wartime Prime Minister, having avoided any appearance of disloyalty to Chamberlain.

Support from the US  1940–1941
When Churchill became Prime Minister in May 1940, Bracken helped in moving him into 10 Downing Street. Bracken was sworn into the Privy Council in 1940, despite his lack of ministerial experience, and became Churchill's parliamentary private secretary.

An insight into the nature of the relationship between Churchill and Bracken is found in Churchill's history of the Second World War. Churchill wrote that he had received telegrams from Washington about Harry Hopkins "stating that he was the closest confidant and personal agent of the President. I therefore arranged that he should be met by Mr. Brendan Bracken on his arrival". The suggestion was that Churchill had arranged, as is diplomatic custom, for Hopkins to be met by the person who was his closest counterpart in British government and that Bracken often played the role of confidant and personal agent to Churchill. After Bracken met Hopkins's flight on 9 January 1941, Churchill and Hopkins forged a close association. According to Charles Lysaght's biography, Bracken and Hopkins had met in America in the late 1930s, and that personal tie helped speed the decision to assist Britain nearly a year before the US actually entered the war.

Minister of Information
In 1941, Bracken was promoted to the post of Minister of Information and served until 1945. At the same time, he was one of the heads of the Political Warfare Executive.

Postwar years
In 1945, after the end of the wartime coalition, Bracken was briefly First Lord of the Admiralty in the Churchill caretaker ministry, but lost the post in the general election won by Clement Attlee's Labour Party. Bracken lost his North Paddington seat but soon returned to the Commons, as Member of Parliament for Bournemouth in a November 1945 by-election. He was a relentless critic of the Labour government's policy of nationalisation and the retreat from empire.

At the 1950 general election, he was returned for Bournemouth East and Christchurch, a seat he held until the general election the following year. In early 1952 he was elevated to the peerage as Viscount Bracken, of Christchurch in the County of Southampton, but never used the title or sat in the House of Lords. He retired from publishing in 1956.

His best-known business accomplishment was merging the Financial News into the Financial Times in 1945. The latter had been published from Bracken House, London, clad in pink stone to match the colour of the paper, just south-east of St Paul's Cathedral, which was remodelled in 1989. At that stage, he was also publishing The Economist. In 1951, with his love of history, he helped found History Today magazine.

Death
A heavy smoker, Bracken died of oesophageal cancer on 8 August 1958, aged 57, in London. Although raised a Catholic, he refused the last rites of the Church despite efforts by his nephew, Rev Kevin Bracken, a Cistercian monk at Bethlehem Abbey, Portglenone, County Antrim, to persuade him. As he was unmarried, the viscountcy died with him.

He was cremated without ceremony at Golders Green Crematorium in north London. His ashes were scattered behind the Cinque Ports  at Romney Marshes of which "his master, Winston Churchill was the then Lord Warden" by Bracken's chauffeur Alex Haley.

Legacy 
Bracken and his relationship with Churchill were the focus of an exhibit at The Little Museum of Dublin in 2016 called Churchill & the Irishman. The exhibit featured a collection of Bracken's letters to his mother. This was the first time that Bracken had been the subject of an exhibition.

In popular culture
In Evelyn Waugh's 1945 novel Brideshead Revisited, Bracken served as a model for the character of Rex Mottram. Bracken is featured in the 1981 TV mini series Winston Churchill: The Wilderness Years, portrayed by Tim Pigott-Smith. In The Gathering Storm (2002), he is played by Anthony Brophy.

It has been theorized that Bracken may have been the inspiration for Big Brother (Nineteen Eighty-Four), as George Orwell worked at the Ministry of Information under Bracken's term as Minister of Information.

2010 and 2015 television documentaries
On 21 December 2010, RTÉ One broadcast an hour-long TV documentary about his life entitled Brendan Bracken – Churchill's Irishman. The programme was made by Spanish production company, Marbella Productions, in association with RTÉ, and examined Bracken's life through photographs, interviews, rare archive footage and dramatic reconstructions, and told of his importance in the areas of British political and journalistic life, despite his attempt to hide from history by having all his papers burned after his death.

The 2015 television documentary Churchill's Secret Son is the 90-minute version of the previous documentary Churchill's Irishman, updated by the producers including additional images, stories about Bracken's life and additional footage. The programme was transmitted on Discovery UK's History Channel on 24 January 2015 at 10pm, as part of the British History week, and coincided with the 50th anniversary of Churchill's death in 1965.

References

Bibliography
 Lysaght, Charles. Brendan Bracken. London; Allen Lane, 1979. .
 Andrew Boyle. "Poor, Dear Brendan: The Quest for Brendan Bracken"; Hutchinson, 1974. SBN 978-0091208608
 Charles Lysaght & Trevor White. Churchill and the Irishman: The Unbelievable Life of Brendan Bracken; The Little Museum of Dublin 2016. ISBN 978-0957028630

External links

 History Today – Brendan Bracken mini-biography by Charles Lysaght
 The Churchill Centre's review of Bracken's life, 2002
 
 
The Papers of Brendan Bracken held at Churchill Archives Centre

1901 births
1958 deaths
20th-century Irish people
Admiralty personnel of World War II
British publishers (people)
Conservative Party (UK) MPs for English constituencies
Conservative Party (UK) hereditary peers
Deaths from cancer in England
Deaths from esophageal cancer
First Lords of the Admiralty
Foreign Office personnel of World War II
Former Roman Catholics
Irish emigrants to the United Kingdom
Members of the Privy Council of the United Kingdom
Ministers in the Churchill caretaker government, 1945
Ministers in the Churchill wartime government, 1940–1945
Parliamentary Private Secretaries to the Prime Minister
People educated at O'Connell School
People educated at Sedbergh School
People from County Tipperary
Politicians from County Tipperary
UK MPs 1929–1931
UK MPs 1931–1935
UK MPs 1935–1945
UK MPs 1945–1950
UK MPs 1950–1951
UK MPs 1951–1955
UK MPs who were granted peerages
Viscounts created by George VI
20th-century British businesspeople
20th-century British politicians